Reginar (or Rainier) II (890–932) was Lotharingian magnate who was active from approximately 915 to 932. He was brother of Duke Gilbert of Lotharingia, who died at the Battle of Andernach in 939, and because his son and grandson claimed it, he probably already personally held the fort of Mons in Hainaut as the seat of a county.

History
He was the son of Reginar I Longneck, and this means his paternal grandmother was possibly a daughter of Charles the Bald and Ermentrude.

Flodoard's Annals, reports under the year 924 that Reginar the brother of Duke Gilbert of Lotharingia already had a son who was given as a hostage during conflicts between several of the Lotharingian magnates of the time.

By 943 he was dead, because a charter made in favor of his widowed daughter was done partly in the name of atoning for his sins.

Family
Reginar II had at least three children with Adelaide, daughter of Richard, Duke of Burgundy:
 Reginar III, Count of Hainaut
 Rudolf, possibly a Count in the Hesbaye
 Possibly Liethard or Liechard, a son mentioned in one 966 charter as a son of a Count Reginar.
 A daughter who married to Nibelung, Count of Betuwe.
Upon his death, Reginar was succeeded as Count of Hainaut by his son and namesake.

References

890 births
932 deaths
House of Reginar
Counts of Hainaut